Joshua Mason Macomber, A.M., M.D (J Mason Macomber), (October 11, 1811 – February 9, 1881) was a noted educator and a physician from New Salem, Massachusetts, United States.

Early life
Macomber grew up Baptist in New Salem, Mass. He came in later life to be a Unitarian. Macomber attended Amherst College for 1 year and then Brown University, from which he received his undergraduate degree, A.M., 1835. He married Sarah A. Lee of Chester in 1838. During the time he was at Brown, he first came to Uxbridge, Massachusetts and worked at the Uxbridge Academy. He served in a number of New England Preparatory academies in the 1830s.

Career
He returned to Uxbridge in 1841 to become the principal at the Uxbridge Academy. J. Mason Macomber was the principal of Uxbridge Academy from 1841 to 1850. Famous Historian and writer, William Augustus Mowry detailed this accomplished educator's life in a biographical sketch with the publication, "The Uxbridge Academy-A brief history with a Biographical Sketch of J. Mason Macomber, A.M., M.D". The Uxbridge Academy was formed in 1818 at Uxbridge, Massachusetts. It flourished in the early, mid, 19th century and graduated a number of prominent citizens as one of New England's historic preparatory academies. The Uxbridge Academy developed a widespread reputation and during his tenure attracted hundreds of students from hundreds of communities in from at least six states.

Later career
In 1851 he enrolled at the New York Medical College to study to become a physician. He graduated from New York Medical College in 1854. He became a professor in the University of Pennsylvania Medical College at Philadelphia. Around 1861 his only son died at the age of 18. He was devastated, and although he could have stayed and taught at Penn, he chose instead to return to Uxbridge. He remained in Uxbridge and active as a Unitarian and in community service until his death in 1881.

References

People from Uxbridge, Massachusetts
1811 births
1881 deaths
People from New Salem, Massachusetts
Educators from Philadelphia
19th-century American educators